Joe Matt (born September 3, 1963) is an American cartoonist, best known for his autobiographical work, Peepshow.

Early life
Matt was born in Philadelphia, Pennsylvania.  He started drawing comics in 1987.

Career
In his autobiographical comic Peepshow, Joe Matt examines his inadequate social skills, his addiction to pornography, his cantankerous relationship with his then-girlfriend Trish, and the lingering effects of his Catholic upbringing.

Matt began creating 'Peepshow' in 1987. In 1992, his 'Peepshow' strips were serialized by Kitchen Sink Press under the title 'Peepshow: The Cartoon Diary of Joe Matt'. His work is now published by Canadian publishing house Drawn & Quarterly.

Joe Matt's work on Peepshow is part of the autobiographical comics genre, kick-started by the confessional stories of Harvey Pekar and Robert Crumb. Along with these artists, Joe Matt's work frequently involves soliloquies "to camera". Peepshow is part of a self-referential universe that includes Matt's contemporaries Chester Brown and Seth, all of whom have included each other in their books.

In 2004, it was reported that HBO was developing an animated series based on Matt's comic "The Poor Bastard," a collection of stories within Peepshow #1 to #6. The series would be produced by Matt and David X. Cohen. However, Joe Matt later stated, "Yes, HBO was interested in making a series based on The Poor Bastard, but they came to their senses and changed their mind. Please feel sorry for me and buy the book when it comes back into print in January 2007."

The most recent issue of Peepshow, #14, went on sale November 1, 2006. A collection featuring Peepshow #11-14 titled Spent was released in June 2007. Matt has stated that "I'll soon be writing / drawing about L.A. for a book that most likely will not be released as single issues, but rather a self-contained book".

Colorist 
Though Peepshow has developed a solid fan base, Matt has served as a colorist for other comics to make ends meet, most notably on superhero comics, a genre which Matt himself dislikes. Among his credits as a colorist are the BatmanGrendelLimited Series, Fish Police and Jonny Quest.

Personal life
Matt lived (illegally) in Canada from 1988 to 2002. He currently lives in the Los Feliz neighborhood of Los Angeles, California.

Awards 
Matt has received recognition for his work in the comics industry. For Peepshow, he has been nominated for four Harvey Awards: for Best New Talent in 1990 and for the Award for Humor in 1991, 1992, and 1993.

Also, despite his view on coloring as a task that merely "pays the bills", Matt was nominated for a 1989 Harvey Award for his coloring work on the Batman/Grendel series.

Bibliography 
Peepshow #1–14 (Drawn & Quarterly, February 1992October 2006)

Four collections of Joe Matt's comics have been published as books, as well as a "jam" sketchbook:

Peepshow - The Cartoon Diary  of Joe Matt, 1992 (Kitchen Sink)/1999 (Drawn & Quarterly), a collection of mostly one-page strips, usually dealing with a single subject, originally published between 1987 and 1991.
The Poor Bastard, 1996 (Drawn & Quarterly), which collects stories published in Peepshow #1–6. This book chronicles Matt's relationship and breakup with then-girlfriend Trish.
Joe Matt's "Jam" Sketchbook , 1998, Collaborations with Chris Ware, Seth, Chester Brown, Julie Doucet, Adrian Tomine, Max, Jason Lutes, Dave Sim, Will Eisner, Marc Bell, James Kochalka, Ivan Brunetti, Steven Weisman, etc., limited print.
Fair Weather, 2002 (Drawn & Quarterly), which collects Peepshow #7–10. In this book Matt chronicles an episode from his childhood in 1970s suburbia.
Spent, 2007 (Drawn & Quarterly), which collects Peepshow #11–14. In this book, Matt chronicles a story arc that documents his obsessive “editing” of porn videos.

References

Works cited

External links 
Biography at Drawn & Quarterly
Interview from MungBeing
Comic Book Awards Almanac
Hand-written interview with Joe Matt from ifpthendirt.

Alternative cartoonists
Underground cartoonists
American comics artists
American comics writers
American cartoonists
1963 births
Living people
Artists from Philadelphia
People from Los Feliz, Los Angeles